The Collected Broadcasts of Idi Amin is a British comedy album parodying Ugandan dictator Idi Amin, released in 1975 on Transatlantic Records.  It was performed by John Bird and written by Alan Coren, based on columns he wrote for Punch magazine.

Track listing
Gunboat Dipperlomacy
Star Gittin' Born
Time Check
Findin' De Lady
Public Announcement
Way to De Stars
Costa Uganda
S.O.S
Up Fo' Grabs
Amazin' Man (played a number of times on the Dr. Demento show)
Weather Forecast
De Colleckerted Works O' Idi Amin

References

External links
The Collected Broadcasts of Idi Amin • Discogs

1975 albums
Cultural depictions of Idi Amin
Uganda in fiction
British political satire
Black comedy music
Transatlantic Records albums
1970s comedy albums